Jake Bernstein is an American investigative journalist and author. He previously worked with the International Consortium of Investigative Journalists. During a 25-year career, he has reported on the civil war in Central America, industrial pollution in Texas, political corruption in Miami, system-crashing greed on Wall Street, and the secret world of offshore accounts and money laundering. He has written travel pieces, reviewed movies and books, and has appeared as a radio and TV journalist.

His 2017 book, Secrecy World: Inside the Panama Papers Investigation of Illicit Money Networks and the Global Elite, takes an in-depth look at the evolution of offshore financial assets, as seen through the Panama Papers, and the journalists and investigators who tried to break through its secrecy. The book was made into a feature film titled The Laundromat, directed by Steven Soderbergh. Bernstein received an executive producer credit on the film.

Career 
Bernstein speaks Spanish and began his journalism career in Latin America as a freelancer. After a brief stint at The Pasadena Citizen, Bernstein joined Miami New Times as a staff writer and reporter (1997–2002), where he covered political corruption and media and the environment with stories including the fight over Elián González, Everglades restoration and the 2000 presidential recount.

The Texas Observer 
In mid-2002, Bernstein joined The Texas Observer as a reporter and editor, and became executive editor in 2004, serving through 2008. During his tenure at the Observer, Bernstein covered stories on government surveillance, Tom DeLay's money laundering legislative takeover and the demographic shift in Texas. Under his leadership, Utne Reader named The Texas Observer, Best Political Magazine of 2005.

ProPublica 
Bernstein joined ProPublica in 2008, shortly after its founding, where he worked as a business reporter. In 2011, he and a colleague won the Pulitzer Prize for National Reporting for coverage of Wall Street in the lead up to the financial crisis. In 2014, Bernstein broke the story of the secret tapes of Carmen Segarra, a whistleblower bank examiner with the Federal Reserve Bank of New York. The story prompted a U.S. Senate hearing.

Panama Papers 
Bernstein worked as senior reporter as part of the International Consortium of Investigative Journalists on the Panama Papers. In addition to sharing a byline on the main story, Bernstein also authored the consortium's piece on the Russian findings in All Putin's Men: Secret Records Reveal Money Network Tied to Russian Leader and the story on The Art of Secrecy in the offshore world. The project won the Pulitzer Prize for Explanatory Reporting and was a Pulitzer finalist for International Reporting.

Bernstein signed with United Talent Agency (UTA) to sell the book for film and television.

Bibliography 
 VICE: Dick Cheney and the Hijacking of the American Presidency, by Lou Dubose and Jake Bernstein. Random House, 2006. 
Secrecy World: Inside the Panama Papers Investigation of Illicit Money Networks and the Global Elite, by Jake Bernstein. Macmillan Audio, 2017.

Awards

External links 
 Jake Bernstein's website

See also 
International Consortium of Investigative Journalists
List of people named in the Panama Papers
The Laundromat — 2019 film, with screenplay based on Secrecy World

References 

Year of birth missing (living people)
Place of birth missing (living people)
Living people
American investigative journalists
American non-fiction writers
Jewish American journalists
Pulitzer Prize for National Reporting winners
21st-century American Jews